This is a list of Canadian television related events from 2002.

Events

Debuts

Ending this year

Television shows

1950s
Country Canada (1954–2007)
Hockey Night in Canada (1952–present, sports telecast)
The National (1954–present, news program)

1960s
CTV National News (1961–present)
Land and Sea (1964–present)
The Nature of Things (1960–present)
Question Period (1967–present, news program)
W-FIVE (1966–present, newsmagazine program)

1970s
Canada AM (1972–present, news program)
the fifth estate (1975–present)
Marketplace (1972–present, newsmagazine program)
100 Huntley Street (1977–present, religious program)

1980s
CityLine (1987–present, news program)
Fashion File (1989–2009)
Just For Laughs (1988–present)
On the Road Again (1987–2007)
Venture (1985–2007)

1990s
CBC News Morning (1999–present)
Cold Squad (1998–2005)
Da Vinci's Inquest (1998–2005)
Daily Planet (1995–present)
eTalk (1995–present, entertainment newsmagazine program)
Life and Times (1996–2007)
Mona the Vampire (1999–2006, children's animated series)
The Passionate Eye (1993–present)
The Red Green Show (1991–2006)
Royal Canadian Air Farce (1993–2008, comedy sketch series)
This Hour Has 22 Minutes (1992–present)
Witness (1992–2004)
Yvon of the Yukon (1999–2005, children's animated series)

2000s
Andromeda (2000–2005, Canadian/American co-production)
Blue Murder (2001–2004)
Degrassi: The Next Generation (2001–present)
Edgemont (2001–2005)
JR Digs (2001–present, comedy prank series)
Mutant X (2001–2004, Canadian-American co-production)
Paradise Falls (2001–present)
Trailer Park Boys (2001–2008)
What's with Andy (2001–2007, children's animated series)
Butt-Ugly Martians (2002, children's animated series)

TV movies

Television stations

Debuts

Network affiliation changes

Closures

See also
 2002 in Canada
 List of Canadian films of 2002

References